Hanson House or Hanson Farm may refer to:

in the United States
(by state, then city/town)

 B. F. Hanson House, Middletown, Delaware, listed on the National Register of Historic Places (NRHP) in New Castle County
 Anton E. Hanson House, Chicago, Illinois, NRHP-listed in South Side Chicago
 Alfred Hanson House, Oelwein, Iowa, NRHP-listed in Fayette County
 George Hanson Barn, Leona, Kansas, NRHP-listed in Doniphan County
 Hans Hanson House, Marquette, Kansas, NRHP-listed
 Alden Hanson House, Midland, Michigan, NRHP-listed in Midland County
 John W. Hanson House, Stambaugh, Michigan, NRHP-listed in Iron County
 Hanson House (Florissant, Missouri), NRHP-listed
 Hanson-Downing House, Kearney, Nebraska, NRHP-listed in Buffalo County
 Howard Hanson House, Wahoo, Nebraska, NRHP-listed in Saunders County
Hanson House (Maumee, Ohio), NRHP-listed in Lucas County
 Stewart-Hanson Farm, Stow, Ohio, NRHP-listed in Summit County
 Nels M. Hanson Farmstead, Henry, South Dakota, NRHP-listed in Codington County
 Olson-Hanson Farm, Clifton, Texas, NRHP-listed in Bosque County
 Soren Hanson House, Hyrum, Utah, NRHP-listed in Cache County

See also
Hanson Historic District, Hanson, Kentucky, NRHP-listed in Hopkins County, Kentucky
Hansen House (disambiguation)